The ABC Auto Sales and Investment Company Building, at 3509-27 Page Blvd. in St. Louis, Missouri, was built in 1927.  It was listed on the National Register of Historic Places in 2012.

It is a four-story building with red brick and white terra cotta cladding, designed by architect David R. Harrison. It was used as an auto distributorship until 1935 for the Hudson Motor Car Company's Essex auto line, featuring a garage bay, an open floor plan, and a freight elevator. The building was later used by a moving and storage company into the 1960s. Laying vacant from the 1980s through the 2010s, it was acquired by developer Paul McKee in 2007.

References

Auto dealerships on the National Register of Historic Places
National Register of Historic Places in St. Louis
Art Deco architecture in Missouri
Commercial buildings completed in 1927